This is a list of VTV dramas released in 2003.

←2002 - 2003 - 2004→

VTV New Year dramas
This film airs from 21:00 to 22:30 on VTV1 in the occasion of New Year 2003.

VTV Tet dramas
These films air on VTV channels during Tet holiday.

VTV1

VTV3

VTV1 Monday night - Weeknight Vietnamese dramas
Note: Unlisted airtime periods were spent for special events.

VTV1 Monday night dramas
Following up the time slot in previous years, these dramas air in every Monday night from 21:00 to 22:00 on VTV1.

VTV1 Weeknight dramas
Since 20 October, the VTV1 night drama time slot (which comprises Monday night time slot for Vietnamese dramas and Tuesday to Friday night time slot for foreign dramas) was split in two lines airing from Monday to Friday: 21:00 to 22:00 for Vietnamese dramas and 22:00 to 23:00 for foreign dramas.

Note: Since 1 August, Vietnam Television Film Production (Vietnamese: Hãng phim truyền hình Việt Nam) has been converted to Vietnam Television Film Center with the short form VFC (Vietnamese: Trung tâm sản xuất phim truyền hình Việt Nam or Trung tâm sản xuất phim truyền hình - Đài truyền hình Việt Nam).

VTV3 Cinema For Saturday Afternoon dramas
These dramas air in early Saturday afternoon on VTV3 with the duration approximately 70 minutes as a part of the program Cinema for Saturday afternoon (Vietnamese: Điện ảnh chiều thứ Bảy).

VTV3 Sunday Literature & Art dramas
These dramas air in early Sunday afternoon on VTV3 as a part of the program Sunday Literature & Art (Vietnamese: Văn nghệ Chủ Nhật).

Note: The time slot was delayed on 2 Feb due to the broadcast schedule for Tết programs.

For The First Time On VTV3 Screen dramas
These dramas air in Sunday night after the 19:00 News Report (aired later or delayed in occasions of special events) under the name of the program For The First Time On VTV3 Screen (Vietnamese: Lần đầu tiên trên màn ảnh VTV3). The time slot has been closed since December this year and not opened again, partly because of the broadcast schedule for 22nd SEAGames.

Note: Unlisted airtime periods were spent for special events.

See also
 List of dramas broadcast by Vietnam Television (VTV)
 List of dramas broadcast by Hanoi Radio Television (HanoiTV)
 List of dramas broadcast by Vietnam Digital Television (VTC)

Notes

References

External links
VTV.gov.vn – Official VTV Website 
VTV.vn – Official VTV Online Newspaper 

Vietnam Television original programming
2003 in Vietnamese television